Janovík is a village and municipality in Prešov District in the Prešov Region of eastern Slovakia.

History
In historical records the village was first mentioned in 1330.

Geography

Population 
It has a population of about 385 people (2020-12-31).

Genealogical resources
The records for genealogical research are available at the state archive "Statny Archiv in Presov, Slovakia"

See also
 List of municipalities and towns in Slovakia

References

External links
 
 
https://web.archive.org/web/20071027094149/http://www.statistics.sk/mosmis/eng/run.html
Surnames of living people in Janovik

Villages and municipalities in Prešov District
Šariš